Doon Hill is an extinct volcano in Aillebrack, near Ballyconneely, Co. Galway.

There is a fort on top of Doon Hill. Bunowen Castle was built in the mid 1700s using the stones from Granuaile's Castle. Oliver Cromwell burnt it in the year 1653. During the Great Famine, the watch tower on Doon Hill was a poor house. The McDonagh family are the current owners of the castle.

Doon Hill is a landmark that can be seen from miles away by land or sea. Coming from Galway, the first glimpse can be got, across the bog in Gabhlan, on the hill above Clifden. Fishermen use it as a landmark to guide them into Bunowen Pier. The Irish name ''dun'' means ''fortress'' possibly indicating that during Celtic times there was a fort on top of the hill. In 1650, the castle and estate was planted by a landlord from Westmeath named Arthur Geoghegan. He inhabited the castle until the year 1840.

The castle is situated in the townland of Bunowen in the barony of Ballynahinch and stands on 365 acres of fertile land. It incorporates a garden - where fruit and vegetables were grown for the Ascendancy - a bathing box, a cemetery and the ruins of a 500 A.D church. The O' Flaherty's who built the castle were driven to Connemara by the Normans.

Mountains and hills of County Galway
Extinct volcanoes
Cromwellian Ireland